Janaab Pakal III, also known as 6 Cimi Pakal, (fl. c.799), was an ajaw of the Maya city of Palenque. He acceded to the throne in November, 799. He was probably last ruler of Palenque and his glyph name comes from blackware vase found in the residential quarter of city.

Notes

Sources 

Rulers of Palenque
8th-century monarchs in North America
Year of death unknown
8th century in the Maya civilization